Lake Placid is a village in the Adirondack Mountains in Essex County, New York, United States. As of the 2020 census, the population was 2,303.

Lake Placid, along with nearby Saranac Lake and Tupper Lake, constitute what is known as the Tri-Lakes region. Lake Placid hosted the 1932 and the 1980 Winter Olympics, the 1972 and 2023 Winter World University Games as well as the 2000 Goodwill Games.

History

Lake Placid was founded in the early 19th century to develop an iron ore mining operation. By 1840, the population of "North Elba" (four miles southeast of the present village, near where the road to the Adirondak Loj crosses the Ausable River), was six families. In 1845, the philanthropist Gerrit Smith arrived in North Elba and not only bought a great deal of land around the village but granted large tracts to former slaves. He reformed the land law and demonstrated his support of abolitionism.

The abolitionist John Brown heard about Smith's reforms, and left his anti-slavery activities in Kansas to buy  of land in North Elba. This parcel later became known as the "Freed Slave Utopian Experiment," Timbuctoo. Shortly before his execution in 1859, John Brown asked to be buried on his farm, preserved as the John Brown Farm State Historic Site.

As leisure time increased in the late 19th century, Lake Placid was discovered as a resort by the wealthy, drawn to the fashionable Lake Placid Club. Melvil Dewey, who invented the Dewey Decimal System, designed what was then called "Placid Park Club" in 1895. This inspired the village to change its name to Lake Placid, an incorporated village in 1900. Dewey kept the club open through the winter in 1905, which aided the development of winter sports in the area. Nearby Saranac Lake had hosted an international winter sporting event as early as 1889 and was used year-round by patients seeking treatment for tuberculosis at sanatoria. The fresh, clean mountain air was considered good for them and was a common treatment for tuberculosis.

By 1921, the Lake Placid area could boast a ski jump, speed skating venue, and ski association. In 1929, Dr. Godfrey Dewey, Melvil's son, convinced the International Olympic Committee (IOC) Lake Placid had the best winter sports facilities in the United States. The Lake Placid Club was the headquarters for the IOC for the 1932 and the 1980 Winter Olympics in Lake Placid.

In addition to the John Brown Farm and Gravesite, the Mount Van Hoevenberg Olympic Bobsled Run, New York Central Railroad Adirondack Division Historic District, and United States Post Office are listed on the National Register of Historic Places.

Sporting Events

Olympic Winter Games

Lake Placid hosted the Winter Olympics in 1932 and 1980.  During the 1932 games, the trails outside of the village served for the cross-country skiing events and the cross-country skiing part of the Nordic combined event. Lake Placid, St Moritz, and Innsbruck are the only sites to have twice hosted the Winter Olympic Games.

Jack Shea, a resident of the village, became the first person to win two gold medals when he doubled in speed skating at the 1932 Winter Olympics. He carried the Olympic torch through Lake Placid in 2002 shortly before his death. His grandson, Jimmy Shea, competed in the 2002 Winter Olympics in Salt Lake City, Utah, in his honor, winning gold in the Skeleton.

In the U.S., the village is especially remembered as the 1980 USA–USSR hockey game site. Dubbed the "Miracle on Ice", a group of American college students and amateurs upset seasoned and professional Soviet national ice hockey team, 4–3, and two days later won the gold medal.  Another high point during the Games was the performance of American speed-skater Eric Heiden, who won five gold medals.

Lake Placid was interested in bidding for the 2016 Winter Youth Olympics but decided against it; Lillehammer, Norway was the only bidder and was awarded the games. Lake Placid shifted its interest toward bidding for the 2020 Winter Youth Olympics, but it again did not submit a bid. As of 2023, Lake Placid is interested in bidding for a future edition of the Winter Youth Olympic Games. The earliest Lake Placid could host is 2028, however Los Angeles will host the 2028 Summer Olympics that year and Salt Lake City is currently bidding for the 2030 Winter Olympics.

Other International Sporting Events

Aside from hosting the Olympic Winter Games, Lake Placid has also attracted other international multi-sport events. 

Lake Placid has hosted the World University Games on two occasions; hosting the 1972 Winter Universiade and the 2023 Winter World University Games.  

Lake Placid hosted the 2000 Goodwill Games.

Regular sporting events 

 Since 1999 it has been a site for the annual Ironman Lake Placid Triathlon, the second oldest Ironman in North America. One of only ten official Ironman Triathlons to be held in the continental U.S.
 ESPN's Great Outdoor Games were inaugurated here in July 2000; they were held in Lake Placid again the following year but moved to Madison, Wisconsin, in 2002 and were eventually discontinued.
 The Lake Placid and I Love New York Horse Shows have been held at the North Elba Showgrounds since 1969.
 Multiple IWPA (International Weight Pull Association) snow Weight pulling events are held at the North Elba Showgrounds yearly.
 Nearby Saranac Lake, New York, hosts an Annual Winter Carnival, one of the oldest Winter Carnivals in the country, complete with an Ice Palace.
 Lake Placid is also home to the Lake Placid Sinfonietta, a professional summer chamber orchestra that has existed since 1917 and offers concerts lakeside.
 The Winter Empire State Games are held in Lake Placid every February.
 The Lake Placid ice dance competition is held every year in July or August in the 1980 Olympic Arena.
 CAN/AM hosts an adult pond hockey tournament. The Canadian American pond hockey tournament is held near the end of February on Mirror Lake. Teams play throughout the weekend on the 20+ rinks for the CAN/AM champion title.
 The Adirondacks Ragnar Relay race goes from Saratoga Springs to Lake Placid every September.
 The Lake Placid Summit Classic Lacrosse Tournament is held every year in early August since 1990. The tournament was founded by George Leveille and is now directed by Kevin Leveille. The Summit Classic is held at Lake Placid Horse Show Grounds, North Elba Athletic Fields, and The Northwood School. Since the establishment of the Summit Classic, the number of participating teams has grown from 7 teams to roughly 250 teams. These teams include men's and women's teams and range in age from youth to adult. The tournament consists of three sessions, all held in August, each ranging from two days to a week. The Lake Placid Summit Classic attracts many lacrosse, sports, food, and entertainment vendors to the lacrosse fields and the surrounding town. Players and families lodge with the Summit Classic's hotel partners: The Golden Arrow Lakeside Resort, High Peaks Resort, and Hotel Northwoods.

Recreational opportunities

Lake Placid is well known among winter-sports enthusiasts for its skiing, both Alpine and Nordic. The area has one of only 16 bobsled runs in the Western Hemisphere.

In 2010, U.S. News & World Report highlighted Lake Placid as one of the "6 Forgotten Vacation Spots" in North America.

Many people use Lake Placid as a base from which to climb the 46 High Peaks in the Adirondack Mountains. Those who complete these climbs may join the Adirondack 46ers.

Lake Placid built its first golf course in 1898, one of the first in the U.S., and has more courses than any other venue in the Adirondacks. Many of its courses were designed by well-known golf course architects, such as John Van Kleek, Seymour Dunn, Alexander H. Findlay, and Alister MacKenzie. The geographic features of the Adirondacks were considered reminiscent of the Scottish landscape, where the game started, and thus a fitting canvas for original play, or "mountain golf."

Lake Placid is near the West Branch of the Ausable River, a well-known stretch of water for fly fishing.

There are also cliffs and streams surrounding Lake Placid, perfect for free cliff jumping. Usually, around 20-50 feet high, these cliffs are good for any thrill-seeker in the area.

Education 

 Postsecondary education
 North Country Community College
 Primary and secondary education
 In Lake Placid, public education is administered by the Lake Placid Central School District.

Lake Placid is home to five private schools:
 Mountain Lake Academy
 National Sports Academy
 North Country School
 Northwood School
 St. Agnes School

Transportation

Lake Placid is served by nearby Adirondack Regional Airport in Saranac Lake,  from the village. Lake Placid Airport, two miles south of the village, has scheduled service provided by Cape Air. 

Other relatively nearby airports include Albany International Airport, Burlington International Airport, Montréal-Pierre Elliott Trudeau International Airport, the airports in the New York metropolitan area, Ottawa International Airport, Toronto Pearson, and the airport in Plattsburgh. Lake Placid is also served by an Amtrak Thruway Motorcoach connection through Westport via limousine service. Adirondack Trailways stops there as well.

Lake Placid is not located on any interstate highway. It can be reached from Interstate 87 to the east via New York State Route 73, New York State Route 86, and New York State Route 9N. County Roads 21, 31, and 35 also serve the community.

In the 20th century, the New York Central Railroad (NYC) operated coaches and sleeping cars to Lake Placid on trains such as the North Star and the Iroquois. The NYC operated passenger trains to Utica, New York for connections west towards Chicago and Buffalo and east toward New York City until April 24, 1965.
A 34-mile rail-trail is being constructed from Lake Placid to Tupper Lake on the old New York Central railbed, with completion planned for November 2024. Track removal between Lake Placid and Tupper Lake (34 miles) was completed in 2021. In 2022, the Adirondack Railroad should commence running tourist passenger trains over the entire,  renovated 108-mile former NYC route from Tupper Lake to Utica, NY. Both projects are being funded by New York State, which bought the entire 142-mile line from Penn Central in 1974.

Geography

The village is located near the southern end of Lake Placid lake. More immediate to the village is Mirror Lake, which lies between the village and Lake Placid.

Demographics

As of the census of 2000, there were 2,638 people, 1,303 households, and 604 families residing in the village. The racial makeup of the village was 95.75% White, 0.68% African American, 0.45% Native American, 0.91% Asian, 0.57% Pacific Islander, 0.19% from other races, and 1.44% from two or more races. Hispanic or Latino of any race were 0.91% of the population.

There were 1,303 households, of which 22.3% had children under the age of 18 living with them, 34.1% were married couples living together, 8.4% had a female householder with no husband present, and 53.6% were non-families. 45.7% of all households were made up of individuals, and 16.9% had someone living alone who was 65 years of age or older. The average household size was 2.02, and the average family size was 2.93.

The population was spread out, with 22.4% under the age of 18, 8.5% from 18 to 24, 33.2% from 25 to 44, 19.3% from 45 to 64, and 16.6% who were 65 years of age or older. The median age was 37 years. For every 100 females, there were 92.4 males. For every 100 females age 18 and over, there were 88.3 males.

The median income for a household in the village was $28,239, and the median income for a family was $43,042. Males had a median income of $26,585 versus $21,750 for females. The per capita income for the village was $18,507. About 8.5% of families and 13.2% of the population were below the poverty line, including 13.3% of those under age 18 and 17.8% of those age 65 or over.

Climate

According to the Köppen climate classification system, Lake Placid has a warm-summer, humid continental climate (Dfb). Dfb climates are characterized by a least one month having an average mean temperature ≤ , at least four months with an average mean temperature ≥ , all months with an average mean temperature <  and no significant precipitation difference between seasons. Although most summer days are comfortably humid in Lake Placid, episodes of heat and high humidity can occur with heat index values > . The average wettest month is June which corresponds with the annual peak in thunderstorm activity. Episodes of extreme cold and wind can occur with wind chill values < .

Ecology

According to the A. W. Kuchler U.S. potential natural vegetation types, Lake Placid would have a dominant vegetation type of Northern Hardwoods/Spruce (108) with a dominant vegetation form of Northern Hardwoods (23). The spring bloom typically peaks on approximately May 12 and fall color usually peaks around October 1.

Notable people

 Bill Beaney (born 1951) college men's ice hockey coach, raised in Lake Placid 
 John Brown (1800–1859), abolitionist
 Chadd Cassidy (born August 3, 1973), AHL coach, born and raised in Lake Placid
 Lana Del Rey (born 1985), singer, songwriter, and poet; raised in Lake Placid
 John Desrocher (born 1964), United States Ambassador to Algeria, raised in Lake Placid
 Godfrey Dewey (1887-1977), president of the Lake Placid Organizing Committee for the 1932 Winter Olympics, son of Dr. Melvil Dewey
 Melvil Dewey (1851–1931), inventor of the Dewey Decimal Classification System for libraries and President of the American Library Association, founder of the Lake Placid Club
 Chris Ortloff (born 1947), former New York State Assemblyman, Chief of Ceremonies and Awards for the Lake Placid Olympic Organizing Committee for the 1980 Winter Olympics, born in Lake Placid
 Kate Smith (1907–1986), singer
 James Tolkan (born 1931), actor
 Craig Wood (1901-1968), Masters Tournament champion (1941), U.S. Open champion (1941), World Golf Hall of Fame entrant (2008)

Winter Olympic athletes

 Lowell Bailey (b. 1981), biathlete
 Ashley Caldwell (b. 1993), biathlete
 Art Devlin (September 7, 1922 – April 22, 2004) ski jumper,  competed in the 1952 and 1956 Winter Olympics, earned three Purple Hearts along with other military honors serving in World War II, founder of Art Devlin's Olympic Motor Inn in Lake Placid, a color commentator for ABC Sports during the 1964, 1968, 1976 and 1980 Winter Olympics, led the effort to bring the 1980 Winter Olympics to Lake Placid. Born, raised, and lived in Lake Placid.
 Peter Frenette (b. 1992), ski jumper
 Mark Grimmette (b. 1971), luge competitor
 Eric Heiden (born 1958), speedskater
 Haley Johnson (b. 1981), biathlete
 Brian Martin (b. 1974), luge competitor
 Chris Mazdzer (b. 1988), luge competitor, 2018 Silver Medalist
 Jack Shea (1910-2002)
 Jimmy Shea (b. 1968)
 Kyle Tress (b. 1981), skeleton athlete
 Andrew Weibrecht (born 1986), alpine skier, 2014 silver and 2010 Olympic bronze medalist, born and raised in Lake Placid

References

Further reading
  Mackenzie was the official historian of the town of North Elba.

External links

 Village of Lake Placid official website
 Lake Placid News
 Lake Placid Olympic Authority

 
Venues of the 1932 Winter Olympics
Olympic cross-country skiing venues
Olympic Nordic combined venues
Villages in New York (state)
Villages in Essex County, New York